Lockhart is a town in the Riverina Region of New South Wales, Australia. It is the location of the Lockhart Shire Council offices. At the 2016 census, Lockhart had a population of 818 people.

History

Lockhart was named after C.G.N. Lockhart - a commissioner for Crown Lands in the Murrumbidgee River area in the 1850s.  It was originally known as Greens Gunyah, and renamed Lockhart in 1897.  Greens Gunyah was so named because a Mr Green was the earliest settler and had a grog shop on the Urana - Wagga Wagga stagecoach route.

Ferriers Post Office opened on 16 May 1882 and was renamed Lockhart in 1898.

In 1915, the Lockhart - Roll of Honour was unveiled, with 86 locals enlisted in National Service.

A railway station served the town between 1901 and 1975, it has now been restored and converted into a New South Wales Rural Fire Service station. Seasonal grain trains service silos in the town.

Tim Fischer, National Party leader (1990–1999) and 11th Deputy Prime Minister of Australia was born here.

Water Tower Mural 
In October 2018 a water tower mural was opened in a park in the main street of Lockhart. It was created by artists Scott Nagy and Janne Birkner (Krimsone) in just three weeks and depicts a cascading waterfall surrounded by local flora and fauna. The mural covers a surface of over 600 square metres. Since the tower was painted, visitor numbers are up by close to 37 per cent.

Spirit of the Land Festival 
Lockhart is home to the annual Spirit of the Land Festival, a celebration to the resilience of those who live and work on the land. The festival, held on the second weekend in October, includes a competition for sculptures created from recycled farm materials. Many of the entries from past years are found in the park around the water tower mural and in other locations on the Lockhart Sculpture and Heritage trail.

Notable Former Residents
 Tim Fischer (Australian politician)
 Bill Peach (Australian journalist)

Gallery

See also
Oaklands railway line, New South Wales (Railway through Lockhart)
Farrer Football League Premiers / Best & Fairest winners lists
Lockhart FNC website
Lockhart Football Club
Albury & District Football League
Farrer Football League
Hume Football League

External links
Spirit of the Land website

References

Towns in the Riverina
Towns in New South Wales
Lockhart Shire